Indian Branch is a  long 1st order tributary to Browns Branch in Kent County, Delaware.

Course
Indian Branch rises on the Murderkill River divide at Melvins Crossroads, Delaware.  Indian Branch then flows east to meet Browns Branch about 1-mile southeast of Melvins Crossroads, Delaware.

Watershed
Indian Branch drains  of area, receives about 45.3 in/year of precipitation, has a topographic wetness index of 577.69 and is about 3.3% forested.

See also
List of Delaware rivers

Maps

References

Rivers of Delaware
Rivers of Kent County, Delaware